Yikes may refer to:
Yikes (comics), a 1997 series by Steven Weissman
Yikes!, a 2011 album by London Elektricity
"Yikes" (Kanye West song), a 2018 song by Kanye West from Ye
"Yikes" (Nicki Minaj song), a 2020 standalone single by Nicki Minaj

See also
Yike